Dinu Bogdan Moldovan (born 3 May 1990) is a Romanian footballer who plays as a goalkeeper for Liga I club Chindia Târgoviște. Moldovan played mostly in Spain for teams such as: Espanyol B and Ponferradina.

References

External links
 
 
 
 

1990 births
Living people
Sportspeople from Alba Iulia
Romanian footballers
Association football goalkeepers
Romania under-21 international footballers
La Liga players
RCD Espanyol footballers
RCD Espanyol B footballers
Liga I players
FC Astra Giurgiu players
FC Universitatea Cluj players
FC Voluntari players
AFC Chindia Târgoviște players
Segunda División players
Segunda División B players
SD Ponferradina players
Liga II players
ACS Poli Timișoara players
Romanian expatriate footballers
Romanian expatriate sportspeople in Spain
Expatriate footballers in Spain